Mladen Georgiev (born 16 October 1940) is a Bulgarian wrestler. He competed in the men's freestyle bantamweight at the 1964 Summer Olympics.

References

External links
 

1940 births
Living people
Bulgarian male sport wrestlers
Olympic wrestlers of Bulgaria
Wrestlers at the 1964 Summer Olympics
Place of birth missing (living people)